Virtuoso Guitar may refer to:

 Virtuoso Guitar (Lily Afshar album), a 2008 video album
 Virtuoso Guitar (Laurindo Almeida album), 1977